Lochlann Ó Mearáin (born 8 August 1973) is an Irish actor known for playing Rohan in the series Mystic Knights of Tir Na Nog.

Career 
In September 1998, Ó Mearáin joined the main cast of the series The Mystic Knights of Tir Na Nog, where he played Rohan until the end of the series in May 1999. In 2000 he played Hoppy Crosby in the series Glenroe. In 2015 he joined the recurring cast of the new Outlander series, where he played Horrocks.

Personal life 
Ó Mearáin is married and has four children.

Filmography

Television

Films

Appearances

References

External links

1973 births
20th-century Irish male actors
21st-century Irish male actors
People from Dún Laoghaire–Rathdown
Living people